Whittington is a small village and civil parish in Lancashire, England, forming part of a cluster of sites along the Lune valley, each with evidence of a motte - as with Melling and Arkholme. This is the densest distribution of Norman castles outside the Welsh border countryside.

Whittington Hall is a large  estate surrounding a grand hall with many out buildings

See also
 
 Listed buildings in Whittington, Lancashire

References

External links
 
 Castles in the Lune Valley
 Whittington Village website

Civil parishes in Lancashire
Geography of the City of Lancaster
Villages in Lancashire